The 1997 season was the Kansas City Chiefs' 28th in the National Football League (NFL) and their 38th overall. The Chiefs improved on their 9–7 record from 1996, and finished with a 13–3 record and as AFC West division champions. The Rich Gannon–Elvis Grbac quarterback controversy was a focal point of the team's season. It brewed throughout the entire season and arguably cost the Chiefs a victory in the playoffs. The Chiefs were defeated by division rival and eventual Super Bowl champion,  Denver Broncos, in the 1997 playoffs. 1997 was the final season the Chiefs appeared in the playoffs during the 1990s and for the next several seasons, they fell into futility. They did not return to the playoffs until 2003.

This was the last season that head coach Marty Schottenheimer would coach the team into the playoffs, with the loss to Denver in the Divisional round 14–10 capping off many years of disappointing playoff struggles. This was also the final season for future Hall of Fame running back Marcus Allen.

Offseason

NFL draft

Personnel

Staff

Roster

Preseason

Regular season

Schedule

Note: Intra-division opponents are in bold text.

Game summaries

Week 1: at Denver Broncos

Week 2: at Oakland Raiders

Week 3: vs. Buffalo Bills

Week 4: at Carolina Panthers

Week 5: vs. Seattle Seahawks

Week 6: at Miami Dolphins

Week 8: vs. San Diego Chargers

Week 9: at St. Louis Rams

Week 10: vs. Pittsburgh Steelers

Week 11: at Jacksonville Jaguars

Week 12: vs. Denver Broncos

Week 13: at Seattle Seahawks

Week 14: vs. San Francisco 49ers

Week 15: vs. Oakland Raiders

Week 16: at San Diego Chargers

Week 17: vs. New Orleans Saints

Standings

Postseason

Schedule

Game summaries

AFC Divisional Playoffs: vs. (4) Denver Broncos

See also
Rich Gannon/Elvis Grbac quarterback controversy

References

Kansas City Chiefs
1997 Kansas City Chiefs season
AFC West championship seasons
Kansas